Azuga is a small resort town in the mountains of Prahova County in the historical region of Muntenia, Romania. It is located at the foot of the Baiu Mountains and contains several ski slopes, including the longest ski run in Romania, the Sorica. Once heavily industrialized, Azuga contains a bottled water factory, (a leftover from a notable beer factory that brewed Azuga Beer, now produced elsewhere in Romania under license), a sparkling wine factory, wine tasting, and lodging (Cramele Rhein, owned by Halewood International). The town offers a view over the Bucegi Mountains, from street level to the top of the Sorica mountain, where a gondola arrival station is located.

Azuga is one of the most famous mountain resorts of Prahova Valley. Until the winter of 2002, Azuga was known as an industrial town. After that date, the town was turned into a resort to capitalize on the mountain landscape of the Baiu Mountains. Shortly after, the Sorica slope was certified by the International Ski Federation. Today, Azuga houses many hotels and hostels that provide accommodation for tourists. Accommodation in local homes can also be found for a lower price. Notable demolished buildings include the beer factory, the glassware factory and the wool cloth factory. The refractory materials factory, while still standing, is closed.

Natives
 Stelică Morcov (born 1951), light-heavyweight freestyle wrestler 
 Simona Păucă (born 1969), artistic gymnast 
 Alexandru Vagner (1989–2022), footballer 
 Gheorghe Voicu (born 1950), biathlete
 Ion Zangor (1938–1973), bobsledder

Climate
Azuga has a warm-summer humid continental climate (Dfb in the Köppen climate classification).

Tourism
The town is an emerging ski resort, with extensive development in tourism infrastructure.

The slope is recommended for both beginners and experienced skiers.

There are also two slopes descending the Cazacu mountain, one is 1,920 meters long (with a drop of 530 m) and the other, more suitable for beginners, is 400 meters long, with a drop of 115 m. Slopes are equipped with ski lifts and a Leitner gondola lift, which goes to the top of Sorica slope, allowing skiers to choose between the two main slopes (access to Cazacu slope requires some tens of meters of ascending, possibly by a small ski lift).

Because of the almost constant winds on the ridge during winter, the uppermost station is a few meters below the top. A higher station would have likely had icing issues, making morning startups difficult as sometimes the only alternative is the snow groomer - snowmobiles not being able to travel in fresh high snow.

In the summer, Azuga is a hiking destination, being a starting point for trips to various mountain destinations in Predeal, Bușteni, or Sinaia. Unpaved forest roads attract many bicycle enthusiasts, who can ride along the Azuga River, which is peppered with small wooden artificial waterfalls that oxygenate the water for the many Trouts that naturally populate the river.

References

Towns in Romania
Prahova Valley
Populated places in Prahova County
Ski areas and resorts in Romania
Localities in Muntenia